Johan Skjoldager (26 August 1894 – 15 November 1969) was a Danish modern pentathlete. He competed at the 1920 Summer Olympics.

References

External links
 

1894 births
1969 deaths
Danish male modern pentathletes
Olympic modern pentathletes of Denmark
Modern pentathletes at the 1920 Summer Olympics
Sportspeople from Aalborg